The Republika Srpska Cup 2013–14 was the tenth season of the Republika Srpska national football tournament.

The competition started on 18 September 2013, and got concluded in June 2014. The defending champions FK Radnik Bijeljina were once again crowned champions as they FK Rudar Prijedor in the final.

Calendar

Competition

Round of 32
This round consisted of 16 single-legged fixtures. All 32 clubs entered the competition from this round, while the matches were played on 2 October 2013.  In case of a draw in the regular time, the winner would have been determined with a penalty shootout.

West

East

Republika Srpska Cup